22nd Brigade may refer to:

Australia
 22nd Brigade (Australia)

India
 22nd (Lucknow) Brigade, of the British Indian Army in  World War I
 22nd Indian Infantry Brigade, of the British Indian Army in  World War II

Ukraine
 22nd Mechanised Brigade (Ukraine)

United Kingdom
 22nd Armoured Brigade (United Kingdom)
 22nd Brigade (United Kingdom)
 22nd Guards Brigade
 22nd Mounted Brigade (United Kingdom)
 22nd Brigade Royal Field Artillery, artillery brigade

United States
 22nd Signal Brigade (United States)

See also
 22nd Division (disambiguation)
 22nd Regiment (disambiguation)
 22 Squadron (disambiguation)